Kemp Powers (born October 30, 1973) is an American filmmaker and playwright. He is best known for his work on the play One Night in Miami, the 2020 film adaptation of the same name, and Soul. His screenplay for One Night in Miami... earned him a Best Adapted Screenplay nomination at the 93rd Academy Awards in April 2021. His work on Soul meant that Powers became the first African-American to co-direct a Disney animated feature.

Career
After writing the 2012 short film This Day Today, he scripted the 2013 play One Night in Miami. In 2017, Powers was brought onboard to write several scripts for Star Trek: Discovery season one episodes. In 2018, he co-wrote the script for Pixar's Soul, with Pete Docter and Mike Jones, as well as co-directing the film with Docter, making his directorial debut. On July 9, 2019, it was announced that actress Regina King would be directing a film adaptation of Powers' play One Night in Miami. On December 16, 2020, Powers hosted the first three episodes of the podcast Soul Stories, which was released as a Spotify exclusive. In the episodes, Powers interviewed several people who worked on the film mainly about their mentors and careers, as well as some behind-the-scenes stories behind the making of the film. An alumnus of Howard University, Powers is the first African-American co-director in Pixar history. In April 2021, Powers was revealed to be directing Spider-Man: Across the Spider-Verse and its sequel Spider-Man: Beyond the Spider-Verse with Joaquim Dos Santos and Justin K. Thompson. In March 2023, Powers premiered his play The XIXth (The Nineteenth) about the two Black American sprinters who raised their fists in protest during the 1968 Summer Olympics Games.

Filmography

Plays 
 One Night in Miami (2013)
 Little Black Shadows (2018)
 Christa McAuliffe's Eyes Were Blue (2021)
 The XIXth (The Nineteenth) (2023)

Accolades

References

External links
 

21st-century American male writers
21st-century American screenwriters
African-American screenwriters
American male screenwriters
Annie Award winners
Howard University alumni
Living people
Pixar people
Sony Pictures Animation people
Year of birth missing (living people)
Place of birth missing (living people)